USADIP (United States Army Deserter Information Point) serves as the focal point for U.S. Army deserter reporting by U.S. Army commanders. Its mission is to maintain, verify, and disseminate information on regular Army, Army Reserve and Army National Guard deserters to military and civilian law enforcement agencies and U.S. Army commanders; to enter and maintain active Army deserters into the Wanted Person File of the FBI National Crime Information Center in order to effect the return to military control of Army deserters.

USADIP is a component of the United States Army Provost Marshal General, serving as part of the operations side of the OPMG (Office of the Provost Marshal General) HQ Staff.

Once a soldier surrenders or is arrested, USADIP is notified and extradition is arranged by the U.S. Army installation responsible for that area of extradition in conjunction with the soldier's parent unit. (Per AR 190-45).

References

United States Army organization
Desertion